Susan Elizabeth Brigden, FRHistS, FBA (born 26 June 1951) is a historian and academic specialising in the English Renaissance and Reformation. She was Reader in Early Modern History at the University of Oxford and a Fellow of Lincoln College, before retiring at the end of 2016.

Academic career
Susan Brigden was educated at the University of Manchester (BA) and Clare College, Cambridge, where she graduated with a PhD in 1979. In 1980, she was elected a Fellow in history at Lincoln College, Oxford. This made her the first female fellow of that college. In 1984, she became a university lecturer in the Faculty of History, University of Oxford. She later became Reader in Early Modern History. At Lincoln College, in addition to her duties as Fellow and tutor, she was the College's Tutor for Women.

Honours
Brigden won the Wolfson History Prize in 2013 for her book Thomas Wyatt: The Heart's Forest. In 2014 she was elected a Fellow of the British Academy (FBA), the United Kingdom's national academy for the humanities and social sciences. She is also an elected Fellow of the Royal Historical Society (FRHistS).

Publications
London and the Reformation (1989) 
New Worlds, Lost Worlds: The Rule of the Tudors 1485-1603 (2000)
Thomas Wyatt: the Heart's Forest (2012)

References

1951 births
Living people
Alumni of Clare College, Cambridge
Fellows of Lincoln College, Oxford
British women historians
Fellows of the British Academy
Fellows of the Royal Historical Society